James Albert Lansford (August 19, 1930January 17, 1989) was a professional American football offensive lineman in the National Football League. He played one season for the Dallas Texans (1952).

External links

1930 births
1989 deaths
People from Jackson County, Texas
Players of American football from Texas
American football offensive tackles
Texas Longhorns football players
Dallas Texans (NFL) players